The 2012 Southern Jaguars football team represented Southern University as a member of the West Division of the Southwestern Athletic Conference (SWAC) during the 2012 NCAA Division I FCS football season. The Jaguars were led by third-year head coach Stump Mitchell out the outset of the season, but after an 0–2 start, Mitchell was fired and defensive coordinator Dawson Odums was named interim head coach for the rest of the season. The Jaguars played their home games at Ace W. Mumford Stadium. They finished the season with an overall record of 4–7 and mark of 3–6 in conference play, tying for second place in the SWAC's West Division.

Schedule

Media
All Southern Jaguars football games were broadcast on KQXL-FM 106.5 with Chris Powers (play-by-play), Gerald Kimble (analyst), and Eric Randall (sideline) calling the Jaguar Action.

References

Southern
Southern Jaguars football seasons
Southern Jaguars football